Francis William Bourdillon (22 March 1852 at Runcorn, Cheshire, England – 13 January 1921 at Buddington, Midhurst) was a British poet and translator. He is known also as a bibliophile.

Life
Born at Trinity Parsonage, Halton Road, Runcorn, Cheshire, Francis William Bourdillon was the eldest son of Rev. Francis Bourdillon, the author, at that time perpetual curate of Runcorn. He was educated at Haileybury College and Worcester College, Oxford, graduating B.A. 1877, M.A. 1882. From 1876 to 1879, he acted as tutor to the sons of Prince Christian of Schleswig-Holstein.

Later Bourdillon lived in Eastbourne, and near Midhurst, Sussex. His friends included Audrey Boyle (1853/4–1916), later as wife of Hallam Tennyson, 2nd Baron Tennyson, known as Audrey Lady Tennyson.

Writer

Bourdillon is known for his poetry, and in particular, for the single short poem "The Night Has a Thousand Eyes".  He had many collections published, including  Among The Flowers, And Other Poems (1878), Minuscula: lyrics of nature, art and love (1897, siftings of three smaller volumes of verse published anonymously at Oxford in 1891, 1892, and 1894), Gerard and Isabel: a Romance in Form of Cantefable (1921), and also Chryseis, and Preludes and Romances (1908).

In 1896, Bourdillon published Nephelé, a romantic novel. He translated Aucassin et Nicolette as Aucassin and Nicolet (1887), and he wrote the scholarly The Early Editions of the Roman de la Rose (1906) as well as Russia Reborn (1917) and various essays which the Religious Tract Society published.

Family
Bourdillon married Agnes Smyth, and they lived at Buddington, near Midhurst. They had three children, including the World War I pilot and later medical researcher Robert Benedict Bourdillon (1889–1971). The mountaineer Tom Bourdillon (1924–1956) was a grandson.

References

External links

 
 
 
 Poems by Francis Bourdillon
Francis William Bourdillon Collection. James Marshall and Marie-Louise Osborn Collection, Beinecke Rare Book and Manuscript Library, Yale University.

1852 births
1921 deaths
People from Runcorn
Alumni of Worcester College, Oxford
English male poets
19th-century English poets
20th-century English poets
19th-century English male writers
20th-century English male writers